Zangezur National Park — is a national park of Azerbaijan. This park is located in a mountainous area. It is cold in winter and hot in summer. The temperature changes between -30 °C to -10 °C in January and 10 °C 25 °C in July. The annual precipitation is 300–800 mm. The running water comes from Gilanchay, Vanadchay, Duylunchay, Aylishchay, Ganzachay, Kotamchay, Kilitchay and Ordubadchay rivers. Rains and melting snow constitute the main part of these rivers.

Flora
Rare plants such as Iris elegantissima, Himantoglossum formosum, Dorema glabrum and other plants occur in Zangezur National Park. 39 species of plants which grow here are included in the Red Book of Azerbaijan.

Fauna
The Zangezur National Park is characterized by a rich biological diversity. 58 species of animals (35 vertebrates and 23 insects) has been recorded. The National Park have such rare and endangered species as Persian leopard, the mountain sheep-moufflon, bezoar goat, white-tail sea eagle, golden eagle, and little bustard.

Furthermore, Nakhchivan is known to have 62 mammal species and subspecies. 32 of them such as blazilius horseshoe bat, southern horseshoe bat, porcupine, manul, bezoar goat and Caucasian muflon occur in the Zangezur National Park. Additionally, approximately 12 carnivorous mammals such as leopard, wolf, jackal, fox, striped hyena, badger, wild cat and other predators constitute an important part of the fauna of the park.

In addition to mammals, 217 bird species and subspecies such as Levant Sparrowhawk, great white pelican, Dalmatian pelican, white-tailed eagle, lammergeyer, short-toed eagle, great bustard and little bustard can be found in the region. 15 of those species were added to the Red Book.

According to a 2010 USAID report (which described Azerbaijan's national parks as "so-called national parks"), public access to the Ordubad National Park is all but impossible, since it requires a personal letter "obtained far in advance of a projected visit, and often refused" from the Minister of Azerbaijan's Ministry of Ecology and Natural Resources (MENR), but this is very difficult to obtain for NGOs, international donors, or anyone outside of the government.

In addition to the rich flora and fauna of the Zangezur National Park is rich with natural and historical monuments.

See also
 Nature of Azerbaijan
 National Parks of Azerbaijan
 State Reserves of Azerbaijan
 List of protected areas of Azerbaijan

References

External links

 Zangezur National Park Official Website - Ministry of Ecology and Natural Resources of Azerbaijan 
 National Parks: Zangezur National Park - Ministry of Ecology and Natural Resources of Azerbaijan 

IUCN Category II
National parks of Azerbaijan
Forests of Azerbaijan
Protected areas established in 2003
Nakhchivan Autonomous Republic
Ordubad District
2003 establishments in Azerbaijan